The Philippines women's national rugby league team (nicknamed Sampaguitas) represents the Philippines in women's rugby league. Representing the Philippines in international rugby league competition.

History
The team's first international competition held on October 23, 2022 ended in a 6-0 loss to Malta. Their next game was on January 28, 2023 against Greece which they won 38–0.

Current squad
Squad vs Malta (October 2022);
1. Leticia Haas-Quinlan
2. Stefanie Thomas
3. Pia Galon
4. Lila Reynolds
5. Tynia Wells
6. Natalia Webb
7. Renee Targett
8. Michelle Koch
9. Tammy Fletcher (C)
10. Erica Rowell
11. Jacky Mae-Lyden
12. Cassandra Koch
13. Janine Jamieson
14. Linae Williams
15. Meagan Rickertt
16. Faith Mella-Reynolds
17. Leah Ellem

Results

Full internationals

References

Women's national rugby league teams
Women's national sports teams of the Philippines